In organic chemistry, a methoxy group is the functional group consisting of a methyl group bound to oxygen. This alkoxy group has the formula .

On a benzene ring, the Hammett equation classifies a methoxy substituent at the para position as an electron-donating group, but as an electron-withdrawing group if at the meta position. At the ortho position, steric effects are likely to cause a significant alteration in the Hammett equation prediction which otherwise follows the same trend as that of the para position.

Occurrence
The simplest of methoxy compounds are methanol and dimethyl ether. Other methoxy ethers include anisole and vanillin. Many alkoxides contain methoxy groups, e.g. tetramethyl orthosilicate and titanium methoxide. Such compounds are often classified as methoxides. Esters with a methoxy group can be referred to as methyl esters, and the —COOCH3 substituent is called a methoxycarbonyl.

Biosynthesis
In nature, methoxy groups are found on nucleosides that have been subjected to 2'-O-methylation, for example in variations of the 5'-cap structure known as cap-1 and cap-2. They are also common substituents in O-methylated flavonoids, whose formation is catalyzed by O-methyltransferases that act on phenols, e.g., catechol-O-methyl transferase (COMT). Many natural products in plants, e.g. lignins, are generated via catalysis by caffeoyl-CoA O-methyltransferase.

Methoxylation
Organic methoxides are often produced by methylation of alkoxides. Some aryl methoxides can be synthesized by metal-catalyzed methylation of phenols, or by methoxylation of aryl halides.

References

 
Alkoxy groups